The 2011–12 season was Ross County's fourth consecutive season in the Scottish First Division, having been promoted as champions of the Scottish Second Division at the end of 2007–08 season. They also competed in the Challenge Cup, League Cup and the Scottish Cup.

Summary
Ross County finished first in the First Division and were promoted to the Premier League for the first time. They reached the first round of the Challenge Cup, the third round of the League Cup and the fifth round of the Scottish Cup.

Results and fixtures

Pre-season

Scottish First Division

Scottish Cup

Scottish League Cup

Scottish Challenge Cup

Player statistics

Captains

Squad 
Last updated 5 May 2012

|}

Disciplinary record
Includes all competitive matches.
Last updated 5 May 2012

Awards

Last updated 27 May 2012

League table

See also
 List of Ross County F.C. seasons

Transfers

Players in

Players out

References

Ross County
Ross County F.C. seasons